Andre  is a village in Põlva Parish, Põlva County in southeastern Estonia. It is known for its farms, most notably its dairy farms.

References

Villages in Põlva County